The tule shoe is a mat of woven reeds wired to a horse shoe. The oversized shoes were invented by Chinese laborers in  1850s California to help build levees and reclaim land in the Sacramento Delta.

See also
Chinese immigration to the United States
Land reclamation
Levee

External links

 Asian Pacific American Historical Timeline Details (1600 to 1874) Our victories, obstacles and leaders
 Review of The Chinese in America, Iris Chang

Horseshoes
History of California
Chinese-American culture in California